The Star Awards for Best Comedy Performer was an award presented annually at the Star Awards, a ceremony that was established in 1994.

The category was introduced in 1998, at the 5th Star Awards ceremony; Mark Lee received the award for his role in Comedy Nite and it was given in honour of a MediaCorp comedian who has delivered an outstanding performance in a comedy. The nominees were determined by a team of judges employed by MediaCorp; winners were selected by a majority vote from the entire judging panel.

Since its inception, the award was given to five comedians. Bryan Wong is the most recent and final winner in this category, for his role in KP Club. Lee is the only comedian to win in this category four times. In addition, Lee has been nominated on seven occasions, more than any other comedian. Jack Neo holds the record for the most nominations without a win, with three.

The award was discontinued from 2006.

Recipients

 Each year is linked to the article about the Star Awards held that year

Category facts

Most wins

Most nominations

References

External links 

Star Awards